Aqarab Abbas is a Pakistani Olympic hammer thrower. He represented his country at the 1996 Summer Olympics. His best toss in those Olympics was a 65.60, while his personal best, set in 1995, was a 68.20.

References

1973 births
Living people
Pakistani male hammer throwers
Olympic athletes of Pakistan
Athletes (track and field) at the 1996 Summer Olympics
Asian Games medalists in athletics (track and field)
Asian Games bronze medalists for Pakistan
Athletes (track and field) at the 1994 Asian Games
Medalists at the 1994 Asian Games
20th-century Pakistani people